Folate receptor gamma is a protein that in humans is encoded by the FOLR3 gene. It is involved in up-take of folic acid.

Gene location 

The FOLR multi-gene family (FOLR1, FOLR2 and FOLR3) is localized to chromosome 11q13.3–q14.1, and encodes the gene products FRα, β and γ, respectively.

Tissue distribution 

FOLR3 is localized in haematopoietic tissue, such as spleen and bone marrow, and is present as a secretory protein. FOLR3 expresses in humans rather than mice and rats.

Function 
The FOLR3 gene is polymorphic due to a nonsense mutation resulting in a truncated protein; FRγ, which can bind folic acid. FOLR3 genes each consist of 5 exons, 4 introns and 1 promoter that encodes a single transcript.

Clinical significance 

Expression of FOLR3 is correlated more strongly with plasma homocysteine(Hcy) than FOLR1 and FOLR2. FOLR3 may decrease plasma Hcy compared with other FOLRs. It was demonstrated that FOLR3 can metabolize both intracellular Hcy and extracellular Hcy. These results indicate that an increase in FOLR3 may effectively ameliorate Hcy in the blood and weaken Hcy-induced toxicity, even in tissues with the low level of FOLR1 and FOLR2 expression.

References 

Membrane proteins